A facial composite is a graphical representation of one or more eyewitnesses' memories of a face, as recorded by a composite artist. Facial composites are used mainly by police in their investigation of (usually serious) crimes. These images are used to reconstruct the suspect's face in hope of identifying them. Facial reconstruction can also be used in archeological studies to get a visualization of ancient mummies or human remains.

Methods

Hand-drawing 
Construction of the composite was originally only performed by a trained artist, through drawing, sketching, or painting, in consultation with a witness or crime victim. The FBI claims that hand-drawing is its preferred method for constructing a facial composite.

Feature-based selection 
Feature-based systems essentially rely on the selection of individual features in isolation. Individual facial features (eyes, nose, mouth, eyebrows, etc.) are selected one at a time from a large database and then electronically 'overlaid' to make the composite image. This allows images to be created when suitable artistic talent is not available.

Such systems were originally mechanical, using drawings or photographs printed on transparent acetate sheets that could be superimposed on one another to produce the composite image. The first such system was the drawing-based "Identikit" which was introduced in the U.S. in 1959. A photograph-based system, "Photofit", was introduced in the UK in 1970. Modern systems are software-based; common systems include SketchCop FACETTE Face Design System Software, Identi-Kit 2000, FACES, E-FIT and PortraitPad.

Welker Facial Reconstruction Technique

This technique was created in order to determine the depth of human face tissue. Welker, was able to measure the depth of human face tissue by inserting surgical blades throughout different areas of the face. He was able to map out the areas of the face that had the most tissue depth. In the 1880's to 1890's a man named Wilheim was able to further advance the Welker Facial Reconstruction Technique. He used thinner needles to achieve a more targeted and precise measurement of depth, rather than using a bulky surgical blade that can distort the surrounding tissue.

Evolutionary systems
Evolutionary systems may be broadly described as holistic or global in that they primarily attempt to create a likeness to the suspect through an evolutionary mechanism in which a witness's response to groups of complete faces (not just features) converges towards an increasingly accurate image. Introduced in the 2000s, such systems are finding increasing use by police forces.

Several of these systems originate in academia: EFIT-V (University of Kent), EvoFIT (University of Stirling, University of Central Lancashire, and University of Winchester), and ID (University of Cape Town).

A 2012 police field trial indicated that an EvoFIT directly lead to the arrest of a suspect and then a conviction in 29% of cases.

Usage

While the classic use of the facial composite is the citizen recognizing the face as an acquaintance, there are other ways where a facial composite can prove useful. The facial composite can contribute in law enforcement in a number of ways:

 Identifying the suspect in a wanted poster.
 Additional evidence against a suspect.
 Assisting investigation in checking leads.
 Warning vulnerable population against serial offenders.

Facial composites of various types have been used extensively in those television programs which aim to reconstruct major unsolved crimes with a view to gaining information from the members of the public, such as America's Most Wanted in the US and Crimewatch in the UK.

Notable cases

These notable cases had facial composites assist in identifying the perpetrator:
 Oklahoma City bomber Timothy McVeigh.
 Niklas Lindgren, also known as "Hagamannen", a serial sexual assaulter in Umeå, Sweden.
 Baton Rouge serial killer Derrick Todd Lee.

References

Crime
Criminal law
Law enforcement techniques
Identity documents